The Impatient Ones is a 1973 historical novel by Yuri Trifonov concerning the assassination of Alexander II of Russia in 1881 by the People's Will party. The novel was nominated for Nobel prize by Heinrich Böll.

References

1973 novels
Novels by Yury Trifonov